James Rogers (11 July 1826 – 22 March 1903) was an Irish-Canadian priest who was the bishop of Roman Catholic Diocese of Chatham. Born in Mountcharles, Ireland, he immigrated to Nova Scotia alongside his parents in 1931. His father, John Rogers, was a sickly man; James, an only child, became the primary income earner for his family when he was in his teenage years.

Rogers entered the seminary in 1847, following John's death, and was ordained a priest on 2 July 1851. To the surprise of many of his contemporaries, he became the first bishop of the Roman Catholic Diocese of Chatham at age 33 on 15 August 1860, when he was consecrated bishop in Charlottetown. On his arrival at Chatham, Rogers found only seven priests to attend an immense stretch of country. During his episcopate of forty-two years, the diocese substantially grew, and when he resigned, on 7 August 1902, he left a diocese of 47 parishes and 51 priests.

Bishop Rogers attended the First Vatican Council where he opposed the declaration of papal infallibility. He invited the Congregation of Notre Dame to open convents in Newcastle, Caraquet, and Saint-Louis de Kent.

Early life and education

Ordination and priesthood

Tenure as bishop

Retirement and death

References

1826 births
1902 deaths
19th-century Roman Catholic bishops in Canada
20th-century Roman Catholic bishops in Canada
Canadian people of Irish descent
Roman Catholic bishops of Bathurst in Canada